Frederick Louis of Mecklenburg-Schwerin (13 June 1778 – 29 November 1819) was a hereditary prince of the Grand Duchy of Mecklenburg-Schwerin, one of the constituent states of the German Confederation. He was the son of Frederick Francis I, Grand Duke of Mecklenburg-Schwerin, and of Princess Louise of Saxe-Gotha-Altenburg.

Marriage and issue
At Gatchina near Saint Petersburg) on 12 October 1799 (Old Style - 23 October) he married Grand Duchess Elena Pavlovna of Russia, daughter of Tsar Paul I of Russia.  They had two children:
Paul Frederick of Mecklenburg-Schwerin (1800-1842) Grand Duke of Mecklenburg-Schwerin, who in 1822 married Princess Alexandrine of Prussia (1803-1892)
Marie of Mecklenburg-Schwerin (1803-1862), who in 1825 married Georg, Duke of Saxe-Altenburg.

On Elena's death in 1803, in 1810 he married Princess Caroline Louise of Saxe-Weimar-Eisenach, daughter of Charles Augustus, Grand Duke of Saxe-Weimar-Eisenach. They had 3 children:
Albert of Mecklenburg-Schwerin (1812-1834)
Hélène of Mecklenburg-Schwerin (1814-1858), who in 1837 married Prince Ferdinand Philippe, Duke of Orléans (1810-1842) eldest son of Louis Philippe I, King of the French
Magnus of Mecklenburg-Schwerin (1815-1816)

After Caroline's death in 1816, he remarried in 1818 to Landgravine Auguste of Hesse-Homburg.

Among Friedrich Louis's descendants are the King of the Netherlands, the Queen of Denmark, the Queen of Greece, the King of Spain, the Queen of Romania, the Count of Paris, the Duke of Parma, the Prince of Sayn-Wittgenstein-Berleburg, the Grand Duchess of Russia and the Prince of Prussia as well as Guglielmo Plüschow and Gunther Plüschow, descendants of his illegitimate son Carl Eduard Plüschow.

Ancestry

Bibliography
  Hélène de Mecklembourg-Schwerin; Madame la duchesse d'Orléans; Nouvelle édition. Paris: Michel Lévy, 1859. DC 269 .O7 M34 1859

Notes 

1778 births
1819 deaths
House of Mecklenburg-Schwerin
People from Ludwigslust
Heirs apparent who never acceded
Hereditary Grand Dukes of Mecklenburg-Schwerin
Dukes of Mecklenburg-Schwerin
Sons of monarchs